Theron Lyman' (September 7, 1869 – September 21, 1939) was a college football player and coach. He was also the chief examiners of claims of the Travelers Life Insurance Company of Hartford, Connecticut.

Early years
Theron Upson Lyman was born September 7, 1869, in Alden, Iowa. His father C. N. Lyman was a long-time reverend of Onawa. It is said Theron spent time at Yale University.

Playing career

Grinnell
Lyman played for Iowa College (later named Grinnell College), in Grinnell, Iowa from 1888 to 1891.

1891
He was the coach of the team as well in 1891, in addition to coaching Nebraska. One account reads "Iowa had an eleven and had a coach, and wanted to play the upstarts from across the Missouri River...So, with a magnanimity seldom equaled in the game's history, Iowa lent its coach, T. U. Lyman, to tutor the Nebraskans."

Wisconsin
Lyman was a prominent quarterback for the Wisconsin Badgers football team. He was captain every year he played.

1893

Parke H. Davis was coach in 1893.

1894

Lyman transferred to Wisconsin in order to defeat Minnesota, which he finally did in 1894.

Head coaching record

*Lyman was coach for preparing Nebraska for the game against Iowa only.

See also
 Minnesota–Wisconsin football rivalry

References

External links
 

1869 births
1939 deaths
19th-century players of American football
American football quarterbacks
Grinnell Pioneers football players
Grinnell Pioneers football coaches
Nebraska Cornhuskers football coaches
Wisconsin Badgers football players
People from Hardin County, Iowa
Coaches of American football from Iowa
Players of American football from Iowa